Currant is an unincorporated community in Nye County, Nevada. Settled in 1868, it was first a farming town with a small population. Its current population is 65.

Name

Creeks nearby were named for the wild currants growing with the town, taking the name from Currant Creek.

History
Currant post office opened April 16, 1883, was reestablished September 19, 1892, and again August 31, 1926, operations suspended December 31, 1943.
In 1914, a small amount of gold was discovered.

In the late 1930s, small but highly productive claims of magnesite deposits were discovered in Nye County while major deposits were in Ely in White Pine County, Nevada, and magnesite mining stopped in 1942.

Transportation
Currant is located on U.S. Route 6 at the junction of State Route 379.

The area is served by the Currant Ranch Airport.

See also

 El Padre Mine
 Red Mountain

References

External links

 Currant, NV video  YouTube, Nov 2006

Unincorporated communities in Nye County, Nevada
Unincorporated communities in Nevada
Populated places established in 1868